Café Minamdang is a 2022 South Korean television series starring Seo In-guk, Oh Yeon-seo, Kwak Si-yang, Kang Mi-na, and Kwon Soo-hyun. It is based on a web novel titled Minamdang: Case Note by writer Jung Jae-ha, which was serialized on KakaoPage and won the grand prize at the platform's web novel contest. It aired from June 27 to August 23, 2022 on KBS2's Mondays and Tuesdays at 21:50 (KST) time slot. It is also available for streaming on Netflix in selected regions.

Synopsis
The series follows the mysterious events experienced by a former profiler who became a shaman, and his colleagues. It also tells the story of a suspicious café named Minamdang and its customers.

Cast

Main
 Seo In-guk as Nam Han-joon: a good-looking profiler-turned-swindler who is a shamanic heresy and has splendid speech skills.
 Oh Yeon-seo as Han Jae-hui: a third-year homicide detective who is righteous, lighthearted and quirky, but a sincere person.
 Kim Min-seo as young Han Jae-hui
 Kwak Si-yang as Gong Soo-cheol: a barista at Minamdang during the day and a homicide detective at night.
 Kang Mi-na as Nam Hye-joon: Han-joon's younger sister who is a former NIS ace.
 Kwon Soo-hyun as Cha Do-won: an intelligent and wealthy prosecutor at the Western District Prosecutors' Office's Criminal Affairs Department.

Supporting
 Baek Seo-hoo as Jo Na-dan: a cute part-time employee at Minamdang who charms customers with his good looks and sweet nature.
 Jung Man-sik as Jang Doo-jin: a veteran detective of fifteen years.
 Heo Jae-ho as Kim Sang-hyeop: a passionate detective.
 Jung Ha-joon as Na Kwang-tae: a rookie detective.
 Jung Eun-pyo as Kim Cheol-geun: the chief of police.
 Hwang Woo-seul-hye as Lee Min-kyung: a VVIP customer of Minamdang.
 Baek Seung-ik as Park Jin-sang: the director of Joyce Entertainment. 
 Kim Byung-soon as Park Dong-gi: Jin-sang's father who is the chairman of a property insurance company.
 Lee Jae-woon as Cha Seung-won: Do-won's older brother.
 Jung Da-eun as Auntie Im: a mysterious fortune teller.
 Won Hyun-jun as Gu Tae-soo

Extended
 Park Hae-in as Lee Ji-eun
 Moon Yu-bin
 Kim Won-sik as Shin Kyung-ho
 Kwon Hyuk as Jeong Cheong-gi
 Jang Hyuk-jin as Choi Young-seop
 Park Jun-seong as Do Jun-ha
 Jo Min-gyu as Hye-joon's boyfriend
 Kim Min-seol as Kang Eun-hye
 Park Dong-bin as Lee Myung-jun: mayor of Shinmyeong.
 Yoon Young-geol as Park Jeong-hyun: a member of the National Assembly.
 Cha Geon-woo as Nam Pil-goo: chief of the anti-corruption department of the Supreme Prosecutors' Office.
 Woo Jung-won as Jeong Hye-yoon: a psychiatrist.

Special appearances
 Song Jae-rim as Han Jae-jung
 Lee Si-eon as Yeo Chun-pal
 Lucy as Han-joon's ex-girlfriend
 Song Joo-hee as Min Yu-seon
 Cha Tae-hyun as a priest
 Eum Moon-suk as Dae-tong
 Heo Jung-min as a detective

Production
The first script reading of the cast was held on November 19, 2021.

On March 29, 2022, Seo In-guk's agency announced that the actor temporarily halted filming for Café Minamdang after testing positive for COVID-19.

Original soundtrack

Part 1

Part 2

Part 3

Part 4

Part 5

Part 6

Part 7

Viewership

Notes

References

External links
  
 
 
 

Korean Broadcasting System television dramas
South Korean mystery television series
South Korean comedy television series
South Korean romance television series
Television shows based on South Korean novels
Television series by Monster Union
2022 South Korean television series debuts
2022 South Korean television series endings
Korean-language Netflix exclusive international distribution programming